Parelia is a monotypic moth genus of the family Euteliidae. Its only species, Parelia albivirgula, is found on Madagascar. Both the genus and species were first described by Emilio Berio in 1957.

References

Euteliinae
Monotypic moth genera